"Moonlight" is a song written and performed by American rapper XXXTentacion from his second studio album ?. The song was posthumously sent to rhythmic radio as the album's third single on August 14, 2018. The song reached many chart positions globally, including a number 13 peak on the Billboard Hot 100 as well as a platinum certification following his death. It's therefore tied with "Falling Down" (with Lil Peep) as his third-highest-charting song in the United States, with both songs falling behind "Sad!" and "Don't Cry" (with Lil Wayne).

Music video
The official music video for "Moonlight" was released on the early night of October 1, 2018. The video was written and creative directed by Onfroy himself, and was also directed by JMP. The video features Onfroy and a large group of people at a get-together taking place in the woods after dark, lit by the light of a full moon. Onfroy is seen sitting by himself listening to headphones and observing the party, as well as walking through the crowd of people who are all dressed in black attire. He laughs as he watches people dance, and also exchanges stares with a mysterious curly-haired girl who is shown several times during the video (based on her appearance she has been theorized to represent Geneva Ayala, Onfroy's ex-girlfriend). Having been released after the rapper's passing, the video ends with the phrases "ENERGY NEVER DIES", "HE IS AMONGST US" and "LONG LIVE JAH" in tribute to Onfroy. A similar phrase, "LONG LIVE PRINCE X", was also featured at the end of his "SAD!" music video. The official music video has over 1 billion views on YouTube

Credits and personnel
 XXXTentacion – vocals, songwriting, composition
 John Cunningham – songwriting, composition, production, mixing
 Robert Soukiasyan – mixing, recording, studio personnel
 Dave Kutch – mastering, studio personnel
 Kevin Peterson – mastering assistant
Laura Francq - song name

Charts

Weekly charts

Year-end charts

Certifications

References

2018 songs
XXXTentacion songs
2018 singles
Songs released posthumously
Songs written by XXXTentacion

Pop-rap songs
Cloud rap songs